Arajuno Canton is a canton of Ecuador, located in the Pastaza Province.  Its capital is the town of Arajuno.  Its population at the 2001 census was 5,150.

References

Cantons of Pastaza Province